Selfotel (CGS-19755) is a drug which acts as a competitive NMDA antagonist, directly competing with glutamate for binding to the receptor. Initial studies showed it to have anticonvulsant, anxiolytic, analgesic and neuroprotective effects, and it was originally researched for the treatment of stroke, but subsequent animal and human studies showed phencyclidine-like effects, as well as limited efficacy and evidence for possible neurotoxicity under some conditions, and so clinical development was ultimately discontinued.

References 

Carboxylic acids
NMDA receptor antagonists
Phosphonic acids
Piperidines